King Hyo was the 6th king of Mahan confederacy. He reigned from 113 BCE to 73 BCE. His true name was Hyo. He was succeeded by Yang of Samhan (Yang Wang).

References

See also 
 List of Korean monarchs
 History of Korea

Monarchs of the Mahan confederacy
2nd-century BC Korean people
1st-century BC Korean people